Bapjaner Bioscope is a 2015 Bangladeshi film directed by Reazul Mawla Rezu, in his feature film directorial debut. It won eight awards, including the awards for Best Film and Best Director at the 40th Bangladesh National Film Awards. The film was shot at char area in the Jamuna River.

Cast
 Shahiduzzaman Selim
 Shatabdi Wadud
 Sanjida Tanmoy

Awards
2015 Bangladesh National Film Awards
 Best Film
 Best Director
 Best Male Playback Singer
 Best Music Composer
 Best Lyricist 
 Best Story 
 Best Screenplay
 Best Editor

References

External links
 

2015 films
Bengali-language Bangladeshi films
Films scored by S I Tutul
2010s Bengali-language films
Best Film National Film Award (Bangladesh) winners
Films whose writer won the Best Screenplay National Film Award (Bangladesh)